Ferros is a Brazilian municipality located in the state of Minas Gerais. The city belongs to the mesoregion of Belo Horizonte and to the microregion of Itabira.  As of 2020, the estimated population is 9,696.

Roberto Drummond was born in Ferros.

See also
 List of municipalities in Minas Gerais

References

Municipalities in Minas Gerais